In mathematics, a near-ring (also near ring or nearring) is an algebraic structure similar to a ring but satisfying fewer axioms. Near-rings arise naturally from functions on groups.

Definition 
A set N together with two binary operations + (called addition) and ⋅ (called multiplication) is called a (right) near-ring if:
 N is a group (not necessarily abelian) under addition;
 multiplication is associative (so N is a semigroup under multiplication); and
 multiplication on the right distributes over addition: for any x, y, z in N, it holds that (x + y)⋅z = (x⋅z) + (y⋅z).

Similarly, it is possible to define a left near-ring by replacing the right distributive law by the corresponding left distributive law. Both right and left near-rings occur in the literature; for instance, the book of Pilz uses right near-rings, while the book of Clay uses left near-rings.

An immediate consequence of this one-sided distributive law is that it is true that 0⋅x = 0 but it is not necessarily true that x⋅0 = 0 for any x in N.  Another immediate consequence is that (−x)⋅y = −(x⋅y) for any x, y in N, but it is not necessary that x⋅(−y) = −(x⋅y). A near-ring is a ring (not necessarily with unity) if and only if addition is commutative and multiplication is also distributive over addition on the left.  If the near-ring has a multiplicative identity, then distributivity on both sides is sufficient, and commutativity of addition follows automatically.

Mappings from a group to itself 

Taking the composition of mappings as the product ⋅, M(G) becomes a near-ring.

The 0 element of the near-ring M(G) is the zero map, i.e., the mapping which takes every element of G to the identity element of G.  The additive inverse −f of f in M(G) coincides with the natural pointwise definition, that is,  for all x in G.

If G has at least 2 elements, M(G) is not a ring, even if G is abelian. (Consider a constant mapping g from G to a fixed element  of G; then .) If  is nonabelian, E(G) is generally not closed under the near-ring operations; but the closure of E(G) under the near-ring operations is a near-ring.

Many subsets of M(G) form interesting and useful near-rings. For example:
 The constant mappings, i.e., those that map every element of the group to one fixed element.
 The set of maps generated by addition and negation from the endomorphisms of the group (the "additive closure" of the set of endomorphisms).  If G is abelian then the set of endomorphisms is already additively closed, so that the additive closure is just the set of endomorphisms of G, and it forms not just a near-ring, but a ring.

Further examples occur if the group has further structure, for example:
 The continuous mappings in a topological group.
 The polynomial functions on a ring with identity under addition and polynomial composition.
 The affine maps in a vector space.

Every near-ring is isomorphic to a subnear-ring of M(G) for some G.

Applications 
Many applications involve the subclass of near-rings known as near-fields; for these see the article on near-fields.

There are various applications of proper near-rings, i.e., those that are neither rings nor near-fields.

The best known is to balanced incomplete block designs using planar near-rings. These are a way to obtain difference families using the orbits of a fixed point free automorphism group of a group. Clay and others have extended these ideas to more general geometrical constructions.

See also
 Near-field (mathematics)
 Semiring
 Near-semiring

References

External links
 The Near Ring Main Page at the Johannes Kepler Universität Linz

Algebraic structures
Ring theory